Osh Region is a region (oblast) of Kyrgyzstan. Its capital is Osh, which is not part of the region. It is bounded by (clockwise) Jalal-Abad Region, Naryn Region, China (Xinjiang), Tajikistan (Districts under Central Government Jurisdiction and Gorno-Badakhshan Autonomous Region), Batken Region, and Uzbekistan (Andijan and Fergana Regions). The resident population of the region was 1,391,649 as of January 2021. The region has a sizeable Uzbek (28.0% in 2009) minority.

Geography
Most of the population lives in the flat northern part of the Oblast, on the edge of the Ferghana Valley.  The land gradually rises southward to the crest of the Alay Mountains, drops into the Alay Valley and rises to the Trans-Alai  Range which forms the border with Tajikistan. In the east, the land rises to the Ferghana Range, roughly parallel to the Naryn border. This area is drained by the Kara Darya which flows northwest to join the Naryn to form the Syr Darya in the Ferghana Valley.

Highway M41 goes south over the mountains from Osh to the Tajik border.  At Sary-Tash a branch goes east to the Chinese border crossing at Irkeshtam.  The other main road goes west through the flat country to Batken Region.

Divisions
The Osh Region is divided administratively into seven districts:

Kara-Suu, Nookat and Özgön are cities of district significance. There are no urban-type settlements in the region.

Demographics
The resident population of Osh Region, according to the Population and Housing Census of 2009, was 1,104,248. Of these, 87,824 people live in urban areas, and 1,016,424 in rural ones. The official population estimate for the beginning of 2021 was 1,391,649.

Ethnic composition
The largest ethnic minority group in Osh Region is Uzbeks, forming 28% of the regional population (308,688 people) according to the 2009 census. In 2009, 40% of all Kyrgyzstan's Uzbeks lived in Osh Region. According to the 2009 Census, the ethnic composition of the Osh Region (resident population) was:

Enclaves and exclaves
Kyrgyzstan's only exclave within Uzbekistan is administratively part of Osh Region (Kara-Suu District). This is the tiny village of Barak (population 627) in the Fergana valley, located on the road from Osh (Kyrgyzstan) to Khodjaabad (Uzbekistan) about 4 km north-west from the Kyrgyz–Uzbek border in the direction of Andijan.

References

Works cited
Laurence Mitchell, Kyrgyzstan, Bradt Travel Guides, 2008

 
Regions of Kyrgyzstan